Survivor 41 is the forty-first season of the American competition television series Survivor. The season was first broadcast on September 22, 2021, on CBS in the United States and Global in Canada.  It ended on December 15, 2021, when Erika Casupanan was voted the Sole Survivor, defeating Deshawn Radden and Xander Hastings in a 7–1–0 vote. Casupanan also became the first Canadian castaway to win the title, the third Asian castaway to win (following Yul Kwon in season 13, Survivor: Cook Islands and Natalie Anderson in season 29, Survivor: San Juan del Sur), the first of Filipino descent to win, and the first woman to win in seven seasons, the last one being Sarah Lacina in season 34, Survivor: Game Changers.

Both the 41st and 42nd seasons of Survivor were originally ordered in May 2020. Production and broadcast of the season was impacted by the COVID-19 pandemic. Filming in Fiji, the ninth consecutive season at that location, had been planned to start filming from March to May 2020, with the season scheduled to air on CBS starting in September 2020 as a part of the 2020–21 television season, but worldwide travel restrictions and Fiji's border closures forced production to postpone to a year in March 2021, and the broadcast pushed into the 2021–22 television season.

Production

Development 

This season was originally to be entitled Survivor: Dawn of a New Era according to Jeff Probst, although production and filming was initially scheduled to start on March 24, 2020, and was to conclude on May 1 onto a standard 39 days of gameplay, but it was pushed back until 2021 due to surrounding international travel restrictions related to the COVID-19 pandemic. Usually, the show releases two seasons per television season year—one debuting around the fall (September) and the other debuting around late winter/early spring (February or March). But due to the pandemic, the Survivor crew was not able to produce this and the subsequent 42nd season in 2020. Production had considered filming domestically in Georgia or Hawaii, but the unpredictability of the pandemic pushed filming back to 2021. On February 11, 2021, Faiyaz Koya, the Fijian Minister of Commerce, Trade, Tourism and Transport, approved filming for this season with the crew required to arrive in groups and quarantine before filming. On March 22, 2021, Jeff Probst announced on-location that production of this season was set to start and filming finally began on April 15. The forty-first season debuted in September 2021.

Unlike most Survivor seasons, it is a shortened season spanning only 26 out of the usual 39 days, due to the COVID-19 pandemic requiring all cast and production members to quarantine for 14 days and taking up some of the short production time. For the first time since Survivor: Borneo, the season's winner was revealed during the Final Tribal Council as production was unsure on the ability to have a live finale due to the concerns of a potential COVID-19 resurgence. The vote reveal was then followed by a Survivor After Show special with the final players and the jury instead of a live reunion.

This is the first Survivor season to impose a significant change in the personal safety protocols following allegations of "inappropriate touching" against a contestant during the filming of Island of the Idols in 2019.

Gameplay
This season introduced many new twists, including the "Shot in the Dark" which offered players at Tribal Council a chance for immunity in exchange for giving up one's vote, the "Beware Advantage" which restricted players' ability to vote until their immunity idols became active, and decision games which forced players to make game-altering choices. One such decision game featured players making opposing—but not necessarily different—choices to either risk or protect their votes in a manner similar to a game of Chicken. Other games of decision included the "Hourglass" twist which gave one player the opportunity to reverse the outcome of a group immunity challenge at the risk of earning tribemates' ire, and the "Do or Die" twist which, in one instance, made the first player to lose an Immunity Challenge perform a risky game of chance similar to the Monty Hall problem just to be able to stay in the game.

According to Jeff Probst, a planned expansion of the Fire Tokens element, featured in Winners at War, was scrapped after David vs. Goliath runner-up Mike White expressed disapproval of the idea.

In addition, Probst announced a new interactive element called The Game Within the Game, in which children watching at home were invited to play along with the show, solving a rebus puzzle hidden somewhere within the episode. Also, at-home viewers could solve a word-scramble puzzle online and be given a strategy discussion test in which the viewers could discuss the strategy and later compare it with what really happened during the next episode's airing.

Contestants

The cast was composed of 18 new players, divided into three tribes: Luvu, Ua, and Yase. The tribe names come from the Fijian words for "flood", "wave", and "lightning" respectively. The merged tribe was named Viakana, which comes from the Fijian phrase for "hungry", was suggested by Erika Casupanan.

The cast included retired National Football League player Danny McCray. Erika Casupanan became the first Canadian resident to compete on the show since the casting process was opened to Canadian residents in 2018.

Future appearances
In 2022, Shan Smith and Danny McCray competed on The Challenge: USA.

Season summary 
Eighteen new castaways were divided into three tribes of six: Luvu, Ua, and Yase. Luvu went undefeated in immunity challenges, while Yase got off to a rough start, losing the first two. Dominated by a women's alliance, they made up for the numbers deficit while Ua dwindled down to just Shan and Ricard. Their strong partnership enabled them to reach the merge, where they initially aligned with Luvu against the surviving Yase members. Liana turned against her old tribe to align with Danny, Deshawn, and Shan in a final four deal. However, Danny and Deshawn aligned with the others under Ricard and Erika's lead to take out a power player in Shan, busting the game open.

When there were six players left, Deshawn tried to pit longtime allies Erika and Heather against each other, to no avail. Despite being targeted for this, he and the others voted out a big threat in Ricard when he was not immune. Xander won the final challenge and brought Erika to the end in hopes that she wouldn't get to add beating someone at fire to her resume. Deshawn narrowly beat Heather to join them in the final three. In the end, Erika's subtly strong strategic and social game earned her the victory in a 7–1–0 vote over Deshawn and Xander.

Episodes

Voting history

Notes

Reception

Critical reception
The season received a mixed response, with many praising the cast and their gameplay as well as the entertaining episodes and unpredictability of the season and Erika’s win, but criticizing the overabundance of twists and advantages, as well as the overall edit and new format of the season. Dalton Ross of Entertainment Weekly ranked this season 21st out of 41. Gordon Holmes of Xfinity called it a mid-level season saying "I think I'll remember this season as having an awesome diverse cast, that was somewhat overshadowed by the need to cram 20 pounds of advantages into a 10-pound bag." Andy Dehnart of reality blurred praised the cast but was highly critical towards the overabundance of twists and advantages. Outlets including TVLine, Insider, and Screen Rant expressed similar criticisms towards the number of twists in this season. Harper Lambert of TheWrap was more critical of the cast due to a "near-total lack of conflict and striking personalities." Riley McAtee of The Ringer was more positive towards this season due to the fewer amount of twists after the merge saying that it was "against all odds, given the changes to the format–a pretty good season of Survivor."

Viewing figures

United States

Canada 
Canadian ratings include 7 day playback.

Notes

References

External links 
 

41
2021 American television seasons
Television productions postponed due to the COVID-19 pandemic
2021 in Fiji
Television shows filmed in Fiji
Television shows set in Fiji